Aubenton is a commune in the department of Aisne in the Hauts-de-France region of northern France.

Geography
Aubenton derives its name from its location near the confluence (in the commune of Hannappes to the east) of the Aube and the Thon.

The commune is located some 70 km east of Saint Quentin and 40 km west by northwest of Charleville-Mézières. The D1043 (E44) road from Hirson to Charleville-Mézières runs along the northern border of the commune.  The village can be accessed from this road by the D5 road running southeast or the D37 road running south-west. The D5 road continues through the commune and south, changing to the D977, and continuing to Rozoy-sur-Serre. The D37 road continues west from the village to Besmont. There is also the D38 road from Leuze in the west passing through the village and continuing to Hannappes in the east. The railway from Hirson to Charleville-Mézières also passes through the commune following the course of the river Thon but there is no station in the commune, the nearest being at Liart to the east. The commune is about 80% farmland with the rest extensive forests in the south. There are a number of hamlets other than the village. These are:

 Bas Val La Caure
 Buirefontaine
 Haute Val la Caure
 Hurtebise
 La Rue Larcher
 Le Bois Carbonnet
 Ribeauville
 Saint-Nicholas

The river Thon flows from east to west through the north of the commune eventually joining the Oise at Etreaupont. The Ruisseau du Bois Carbonnet rises in the south of the commune, discharging into the Ruisseau de l'Étang Polliart, a tributary of the Thon.

Aubenton is surrounded by 7 communes: Brunehamel, Iviers, Beaumé, Leuze, Any-Martin-Rieux, Logny-lès-Aubenton, and Mont-Saint-Jean.

Neighbouring communes and villages

History

Second World War
The department of Aisne has 10 people designated "Righteous Among the Nations" (French people who helped Jews during the war), of whom 3 were from Aubenton:
 Emile Fontaine (a street bears his name)
 Annette Pierron, his girlfriend at the time
 Camille Pierron, mother of Annette and the owner of a farm at Buirefontaine

Shot by the Gestapo on the Aubenton-Besmont road (D37) on 30 March 1944, Emile Fontaine was recognized as a captain in the French Forces of the Interior (FFI) after the Liberation. All three had saved 10 escapees from the "Judenlager of Mazures" who hid for a time at Buirefontaine.

Heraldry

Administration
List of Successive Mayors of Aubenton

Mayors from 1926

Population

Culture and heritage
The commune has a very large number of buildings and sites that are registered as historical monuments. An abridged list of the most prominent historical monuments is shown below.

Civil heritage
 The Girls' School (1876)
 The War memorial (1920)
 The Town Hall (1868). The Town Hall contains two items that are registered as historical objects:
 A Bust: Marianne (19th century)
 A Bust: Lieutenant André Bouxin (20th century)
 Le Chalet Industrial House (1906). The house contains a Fountain (19th century) which is registered as an historical object.
 The Railway Station (1885)
 The old Hotel Collin (13th century) now the Jean Mermoz Museum. The Museum contains several items which are registered as historical objects:
 A Bas-relief: Arms surmounted by lions (16th century)
 A Bust: Jean Mermoz (20th century)
 A Bas-relief: Jean Mermoz as an aviator (1937)
 A Bas-relief: Jean Mermoz (20th century)
 A Lamp called the Lampedaire of Jean Mermoz (1913)
 Jean Mermoz's Cradle (19th century)
 A Commemorative plaque for Jean Mermoz (1937)
 The old Flour Mill (18th century)
 The old City Walls (14th century) of which only two remain of the original seven towers: the Tour de Chimay (in the Tower lane) has been transformed into a cottage managed by the commune. Another tower on private land is visible from the road along the Thon

Religious heritage
 The Fortified Parish Church of Notre-Dame (12th century) There are also a very large number of registered historical objects contained in the Church.
 A Funeral Monument to André Bouxin (1884). The monument is surmounted by a large Statue: André Bouxin in a lieutenant's uniform (1925) which is registered as an historical object.

Photo gallery

Notable people linked to the commune
Jean Mermoz, aviator.
 Joseph Nelson Soye, doctor and MP
 Emile Fontaine, Annette Pierron, and Camille Pierron, resistance fighters and "Righteous Among the Nations"

See also
 Communes of the Aisne department

References

External links
 Inventory of Cultural Heritage for the Canton of Aubenton 
 Inventory of cultural heritage for the Commune of Aubenton 
 Aubenton on Géoportail, National Geographic Institute (IGN) website 
 Aubenton on the 1750 Cassini Map

Communes of Aisne